Southern Regional Technical College is a public community college with its main campus in Thomasville, Georgia.  It is part of the Technical College System of Georgia and provides education services for a seven-county service area in southwest Georgia. The school was formed by consolidation of Southwest Georgia Technical College in Thomasville and Moultrie Technical College in Moultrie.

The school's service area includes Colquitt, Decatur, Early, Grady, Miller, Mitchell, Seminole, Thomas, Tift, Turner, and Worth counties.. SRTC is accredited by the Commission on Colleges of the Southern Association of Colleges and Schools to award associate degrees, Diplomas, and Technical Certificates of Credit. Many of the school's individual technical programs are also accredited by their respective accreditation organizations.

Locations
SRTC's main campus is in Thomasville, Georgia; with other locations in Colquitt, Decatur, Early, Grady, Miller, Mitchell, Seminole, Tift, Turner, and Worth counties..

References

Educational institutions established in 1947
Technical College System of Georgia
Education in Thomas County, Georgia
Education in Grady County, Georgia
Education in Mitchell County, Georgia
Buildings and structures in Thomas County, Georgia
Buildings and structures in Grady County, Georgia
Buildings and structures in Mitchell County, Georgia
1947 establishments in Georgia (U.S. state)